is a railway station on the Yamada Line in the city of Miyako, Iwate, Japan, operated by East Japan Railway Company (JR East).

Lines
Kawauchi Station is served by the Yamada Line, and is located 61.5 kilometers from the starting point of the line at Morioka Station.

Station layout
Kawauchi Station has a single side platform and an island platform serving three tracks, connected to the station building by a level crossing. The station is unattended.

Platforms

History
Kawauchi Station opened on 30 November 1933. The station was closed from 26 November 1946 to 21 November 1954. The station was absorbed into the JR East network upon the privatization of the Japanese National Railways (JNR) on 1 April 1987.
Because of changes on signalling block system, the use of the third track was stopped on 25 March 2018. Then the station became unstaffed on 22 April 2018.

Passenger statistics
In fiscal 2015, the station was used by an average of 53 passengers daily (boarding passengers only).

Surrounding area
  Japan National Route 106

See also
 List of railway stations in Japan
 Kawauchi Station (Miyagi), a similarly named station on the Sendai Subway Tozai Line in Miyagi Prefecture

References

External links

  

Railway stations in Iwate Prefecture
Yamada Line (JR East)
Railway stations in Japan opened in 1933
Miyako, Iwate
Stations of East Japan Railway Company